Zacapa is the departmental capital municipality of Zacapa Department, one of the 22 Departments of Guatemala.

Sports
Football club Deportivo Zacapa competes in Guatemala's top division and play their home games at the Estadio David Ordoñez Bardales.  Their team mascot is the Gallo (rooster).

Etymology
Historian and poet, Capitán Don Francisco Antonio De Fuentes Y Guzmán notes in his Remembrance Florida, the name Zacapa derives from Nahuatl Zacatl meaning grass or weed, and apan meaning in the river, a word which in turn is composed of atl also meaning water, river, and apan. Zacapa means on the river of grass.

See also

 Zacapa rum, a brand named for this department.

References

Municipalities of the Zacapa Department